Nicholsville  may refer to one of the following places:
Nicholsville, Alabama
Nicholsville, Nova Scotia
Nicholsville, Ohio